A change request (aka Change Control Request, or CCR) is a document containing a call for an adjustment of a system; it is of great importance in the change management process.

Purpose and elements
A change request is declarative, i.e. it states what needs to be accomplished, but leaves out how the change should be carried out. Important elements of a change request are an ID, the customer (ID), the deadline (if applicable), an indication whether the change is required or optional, the change type (often chosen from a domain-specific ontology) and a change abstract, which is a piece of narrative (Keller, 2005). An example of a change request can be found in Figure 1 on the right.

Sources
Change requests typically originate from one of five sources: 
 problem reports that identify bugs that must be fixed, which forms the most common source
 system enhancement requests from users
 events in the development of other systems
 changes in underlying structure and or standards (e.g. in software development this could be a new operating system)
 demands from senior management (Dennis, Wixom & Tegarden, 2002).
Additionally, in Project Management, change requests may also originate from an unclear understanding of the goals and the objectives of the project.

Synonyms
Change requests have many different names, which essentially describe the same concept:
 Request For Change (RFC) by Rajlich (1999); RFC is also a common term in ITIL (Keller, 2005) and PRINCE2 (Onna & Koning, 2003).
 Engineering Change (EC) by Huang and Mak (1999);
 Engineering Change Request (ECR) at Aero (Helms, 2002);
 Engineering Change Order (ECO) by Loch and Terwiesch (1999) and Pikosz and Malmqvist (1998). Engineering Change Order is a separate step after ECR. After ECR is approved by Engineering Department then an ECO is made for making the change;
 Change Notice at Chemical (Helms, 2002);
 Action Request (AR) at ABB Robotics AB (Kajko-Mattson, 1999);
 Change Request (CR) is, among others, used by Lam (1998), Mäkäräinen (2000), Dennis, et al. (2002), Crnkovic, Asklund and Persson-Dahlqvist (2003) and at ABB Automation Products AB (Kajko-Mattsson, 1999).
 Operational Change Request (OCR).
 Enterprise Change Request (ECR).

See also
Change management (engineering)
Change control
Change order
Engineering Change Order

References

Further reading 
Crnkovic I., Asklund, U. & Persson-Dahlqvist, A. (2003). Implementing and Integrating Product Data Management and Software Configuration Management. London: Artech House.
Dennis, A., Wixom, B.H. & Tegarden, D. (2002). System Analysis & Design: An Object-Oriented Approach with UML. Hoboken, New York: John Wiley & Sons, Inc.
Helms, R.W. (2002). Product Data Management as enabler for Concurrent Engineering. PhD dissertation. Eindhoven: Eindhoven University of Technology press. Available online: http://alexandria.tue.nl/extra2/200211339.pdf.
Huang, G.H. & Mak, K.L. (1999). Current practices of engineering change management in UK manufacturing industries. International Journal of Operations & Production Management, 19(1), 21–37.
Kajko-Mattsson, M. (1999). Maintenance at ABB (II): Change Execution Processes (The State of Practice). Proceedings of the International Conference on Software Maintenance, 307–315.
Keller, A. (2005). Automating the Change Management Process with Electronic Contracts. Proceedings of the 2005 Seventh IEEE International Conference on E-Commerce Technology Workshops, 99-108.
Lam, W. (1998). Change Analysis and Management in a Reuse-Oriented Software Development Setting. In Pernici, B. & Thanos, C. (Eds.) Proceedings of the Tenth International Conference on Advanced Information Systems Engineering, 219–236.
Loch, C.H. & Terwiesch, C. (1999). Accelerating the Process of Engineering Change Orders: Capacity and Congestion Effects. Journal of Product Innovation Management, 16(2), 145–159.
Mäkäräinen, M. (2000). Software change management processes in the development of embedded software. PhD dissertation. Espoo: VTT Publications. Available online: http://www.vtt.fi/inf/pdf/publications/2000/P416.pdf.
Onna, M. van & Koning, A. (2003). The Little Prince 2: A Practical Guide to Project Management, Pink Roccade Educational Services/Ten Hagen Stam.
Pikosz, P. & Malmqvist, J. (1998). A comparative study of engineering change management in three Swedish engineering companies. Proceedings of the DETC98 ASME Design Engineering Technical Conference, 78–85.
Rajlich, V. (1999). Software Change and Evolution. In Pavelka, J., Tel, G. & Bartošek, M. (Eds.), SOFSEM'99, Lecture Notes in Computer Science 1725, 189–202.
DiDonato, P. (2001). Oakley Inc, Developing XML systems with (CRF).

Systems engineering
Business terms